is the 8th single by the Japanese female idol group Momoiro Clover Z, released in Japan on June 27, 2012. It became the first Momoiro Clover's single to be certified Gold by the Recording Industry Association of Japan for shipments of 100,000 copies.

Release 
The single was released in four versions: Limited Edition A, Limited Edition B, Regular Edition 1, and Regular Edition 2 (Pokémon Edition). Each version has a different cover. The limited edition A came with a DVD featuring the music video for the title track, the limited edition B with the music video for the B-side "Push", but the limited editions contained less songs on the CD in comparison to the regular CD-only edition.

Music 
At over 7 minutes long in the music video version, the song is unusually long for a single. It was written by Etsuko Yakushimaru a.k.a. Tika α, who had composed for such artists as Tomohisa Yamashita and SMAP. When the title and the cover art were made public, she hinted at what the song was like by describing its outlook of the world as "When this battle is over, we are all going to a chorus contest." The song is a mosaic of Japanese-oldies-style melodies and contemporary music. The song can be interpreted as Momoiro Clover's (whose popularity is rising) proclamation of war for the top of the Japanese idol music scene, as a declaration of war for an ultimate idol showdown.

The B-side "Push" is a cheer anthem. It was used as an advertising song for an ice cream product called "Sō" by Lotte.

"Mite Mite Kotchitchi" is included on the regular editions only. It is an ending theme for the TV anime series Pokémon: Best Wishes! and for the Pokémon theatrical film Meloetta no Kirakira Recital.

Cover art 
There is a secret hidden on the cover of the Limited Edition B. If you look closely at Reni Takagi who is lying on the grass, there's an Sō ice cream treat nearby. On the edition's back cover, the girls form the ice cream's name, the character  (Sō)

Music video 
The "Otome Sensō" music video switches between Momoiro Clover in school uniforms praying that their bittersweet youth won't be destroyed and Momoiro Clover in combat armor fighting affectionately. The combat costumes were drafted by Sushio, an animator who worked on such films as Neon Genesis Evangelion, Gurren Lagann, theatrical versions of One Piece.

Critical response 
Yūki Sugioka from Hotexpress gives the single a highly positive review. She notes that the title track, written by Etsuko Yakushimaru, is completely different from the band's previous work. In the song, she counts roughly six or seven distinct parts, one of which, in her words, "is a melancholic ennui melody that will definitely put a smile on the face of a Sōtaisei Riron fan." (Sōtaisei Riron is the band where Etsuko Yakushimaru is the lead singer.) Overall, she defines the title track as a "mix of high-calorie youth anthems", and the B-side "Push" as a "fast-paced inspiring fight song". She adds that what is most important is that the whole single, every track on it, really makes you adore Momoiro Clover Z.

Reception 
The CD single debuted at the 3rd place in the Oricon Weekly Singles Chart, selling 67,596 copies in that first week. It tied for Momoiro Clover's highest position with "Ikuze! Kaitō Shōjo" and "Mirai Bowl / Chai Maxx", but could not do better because of new songs by KAT-TUN and Girls' Generation that were released on the same day. In the Billboard Japan Hot 100 chart, the title track debuted also in the 3rd place.

Track listing

Limited Edition A, Limited Edition B

Regular Edition 1, Regular Edition 2 (Pokémon Edition)

Chart performance

"Mite Mite Kotchitchi"

References

External links 
 CD single profile on the official site

.

2012 singles
Japanese-language songs
Momoiro Clover Z songs
King Records (Japan) singles
2012 songs